Yves Triantafyllos (alternative spellings Triantafil(l)os, Triandafyl(l)os, Triandafil(l)os; Greek: Υβ Τριαντάφυλλος; born 27 October 1948) is a French former professional footballer who played as a striker.

Having been part of France's squad for the 1968 Summer Olympics, Triantafyllos made one appearance for the France national team in a friendly against Hungary in 1975.

Honours
Saint-Étienne
Division 1: 1966–67, 1974–75, 1975–76
Coupe de France: 1974–75

Nantes
Division 1: 1976–77

Olympiacos
Alpha Ethiki: 1972–73, 1973–74
Greek Cup: 1972–73; runner-up: 1973–74

Individual
Division 2 Group North top scorer: 1970–71

References
Phantis: Yves Triantafyllos
Profile

1948 births
Living people
People from Montbrison, Loire
French people of Greek descent
Sportspeople from Loire (department)
French footballers
Footballers from Auvergne-Rhône-Alpes
Association football forwards
France international footballers
Ligue 1 players
Ligue 2 players
Super League Greece players
AS Saint-Étienne players
US Boulogne players
Olympiacos F.C. players
FC Nantes players
FC Rouen players
Kallithea F.C. players
Olympic footballers of France
Footballers at the 1968 Summer Olympics